Diaphus gigas is a species of lanternfish found in the North Pacific Ocean.

Size

Etymology
The fish is named in because it is large, at 170 mm TL, the largest species in Gilbert's monograph on the lanternfishes of Japan.

References

Myctophidae
Taxa named by Charles Henry Gilbert
Fish described in 1913